The ranks and rank insignia of the Red Army and Red Navy between 1940 and 1943 were characterised by continuing reforms to the Soviet armed forces in the period immediately before Operation Barbarossa and the war of national survival following it.  The Soviet suspicion of rank and rank badges as a bourgeois institution remained, but the increasing experience of Soviet forces, and the massive increase in manpower all played their part, including the creation of a number of new general officer ranks and the reintroduction of permanent enlisted ranks and ratings.

Change of military rank insignia 
From May 1940 the introduction of general ranks in the Red Army and flag officer ranks in the Soviet Navy was officially sanctioned, by decree of the Presidium of the Supreme Soviet. The following general officer ranks were introduced with corresponding insignia:
 High level force commanding staff — major general, lieutenant general, colonel general and general of the army
 Artillery commanders — major general of the artillery, lieutenant general of the artillery and colonel general of the artillery
 Air force commanders (including naval aviation) — major general of aviation, lieutenant general of the aviation, and colonel general of aviation
 Armoured corps commanders — major general of the armoured corps, lieutenant general of the armoured corps, and colonel general of the armoured corps
 Communications troops commanders — major general of the communications troops, lieutenant general of the communications troops and colonel general of the communications troops
 Engineer troops commanders — major general of the engineer troops, lieutenant general of the engineer troops and colonel general of the engineer troops
 Commanding staff of other arms and services (including: chemical, railway, transport and military cartography) — major general of the technical troops, lieutenant general of the technical troops, and colonel general of the technical troops
 Leading staff of the commissariat service — major general of the commissariat service, lieutenant general of the commissariat service, and colonel general of the commissariat service
 Flag officers of the Soviet Navy — rear admiral, vice admiral, admiral, and admiral of the fleet
 Generals of the Soviet Navy on coastal service — major general of the coastal service, lieutenant general of the coastal service, and colonel general of the coastal service
 Engineer flag officers of the Soviet Navy — rear admiral engineer, vice admiral engineer, and admiral engineer

On 4 June 1940, the first promotions to the newly established ranks were made. First to be promoted to the rank of army general were Zukov, Meretskov and Tyulenev. The rank insignia that characterized it were as follows:
 Gorget patch: One large star in gold embroidery, on the lower part two round laurel twigs and the hammer & sickle emblem.
 Sleeve: One large star in gold embroidery, red piping, below a red coloured chevron in gold embroidery, surrounded by two gold laurel-twigs with red piping.

The rank of marshal of the Soviet Union, established in September 1935, remained unchanged. What would become a future rank system started to take shape with the promotion of the first Marshal of Artillery in early 1943, with the collar patch of a Marshal but in black.

With the new rank regulations came the reintroduction of the Yefreytor rank to the Army and Air Force and the introduction of new ratings for the Navy: Leading Red Fleet Man (naval services) and Yefreytor (coastal services).

Ranks and rank insignia 

The general intention of rejecting traditional rank insignia (as opposed to the epaulettes and shoulder boards of Imperial Russian forces) was maintained. The large gorget patches were modified. The rhombic patches previously used by generals were replaced by one five-pointed golden star. A new emblem, the symbol of a particular branch of service, was added. The general's star remained slightly smaller than the marshal's star.

The small gorget patches, mounted on the tunic (or gymnastyorka), remained unchanged, but they were made in the corps colour and contained an emblem to indicate the branch of service or special appointment. The previously- used gold coloured rank chevrons for general ranks  were retained with small modifications.

Corps colours, emblems 

The corps colours of 1935 were maintained, with minor changes.

Trouser stripes, gorget rank insignia and cap piping was given to  general officers and marshals of the Soviet Union:
 Artillery and armour generals: black gorgets with red piping and deep red trouser stripes
 Air force: Blue gorgets
 Generals of communication troops, engineer troops, technical troops and the commissariat service: Crimson gorgets

The rank of general of the artillery, of armoured troops, of the air force, of communication troops, of engineer troops, of technical troops and of the commissariat service wore on the gorget the appropriate emblem of their branch of service, special force, or assignment.
Corps colour, typical to the branch of service were:
 Infantry: Raspberry
 Artillery and transport troops: Black
 Air force and air defence: Blue
 Cavalry: Dark blue
 Rear services (supply, maintenance, transport, medical, etc.): Dark green
 Ministry of the interior and state security:
 Border troops: Light green
 State security: Blue
 All others: Chestnut-brown

Rank insignia of the army and air force

Higher, senior and middle commanders

Junior commanders and enlisted men

Rank insignia of the Soviet Navy 1940–1943

Flag officers

Naval officers

Lower commanding staff and enlisted ratings 

The 1940 regulations reinstated ground force-style ranks to the coastal services of the Navy.

See also 
 History of Russian military ranks
 Ranks and insignia of the Imperial Russian Armed Forces
 Military ranks of the Soviet Union (1918–1935)
 Military ranks of the Soviet Union (1935–1940)
 Military ranks of the Soviet Union (1943–1955)
 Military ranks of the Soviet Union (1955–1991)
 Ranks and rank insignia of the Russian Federation's armed forces 1994–2010

References 
Citations

Sources

 

Russian Federation Army
Military ranks of the Soviet Union